Pacific Standard Time: Art in L.A., 1945–1980 was a scholarly initiative funded by the J. Paul Getty Trust to historicize the contributions to contemporary art history of artists, curators, critics, and others based in Los Angeles. Planned for nearly a decade, PST, as it was called, granted nearly 60 organizations throughout Southern California a total of $10 million to produce exhibitions (on view between September 2011 and April 2012) that explored the years between 1945 and 1980. Underscoring the significance of this project, art critic Roberta Smith wrote in The New York Times:

ARTnews named the initiative as the decade's most important exhibition and cited how its archival research project had already impacted the history of art by the end of the decade through multiple exhibitions of historically underrepresented work.

Among the artists included
 Vija Celmins
 Jay DeFeo
 Sonia Gechtoff
 Wally Hedrick
 Craig Kauffman
 Linda Nishio
 Gordon Wagner

Participating arts institutions
The following organizations presented exhibitions in conjunction with Pacific Standard Time:

 18th Street Arts Center, Santa Monica
 A+D Architecture and Design Museum, Los Angeles
 American Museum of Ceramic Art (AMOCA), Pomona 
 Armory Center for the Arts, Pasadena
 Art, Design & Architecture Museum, University of California, Santa Barbara
 Autry National Center, Los Angeles
 Berkeley Art Museum and Pacific Film Archive, University of California, Berkeley
 California African American Museum (CAAM), Los Angeles
 California Institute of the Arts (CalArts) / REDCAT, Los Angeles
 California Museum of Photography, University of California, Riverside
 Chapman University Guggenheim Gallery, Orange
 Chicano Studies Research Center, University of California, Los Angeles
 Chinese American Museum, Los Angeles
 City of Los Angeles, Department of Cultural Affairs
 Craft and Folk Art Museum (CAFAM), Los Angeles
 Craft in America, Los Angeles
 Crossroads School, Sam Francis Gallery, Santa Monica
 Eames House Foundation, Pacific Palisades
 Fisher Museum of Art, University of Southern California, Los Angeles
 Fowler Museum, University of California, Los Angeles
 Getty Conservation Institute, Los Angeles
 The J. Paul Getty Museum, Los Angeles
 Getty Research Institute, Los Angeles
 The GRAMMY Museum, Los Angeles
 Hammer Museum, University of California, Los Angeles
 Huntington Library, Art Collections, and Botanical Gardens, San Marino
 Institute for Arts and Media, California State University, Northridge
 Japanese American National Museum, Los Angeles
 Laguna Art Museum, Laguna Beach
 LA><ART, Los Angeles
 Los Angeles Nomadic Division (LAND)
 Long Beach Museum of Art (LBMA)
 (LACE) Los Angeles Contemporary Exhibitions
 Los Angeles County Museum of Art (LACMA)
 Los Angeles Municipal Art Gallery
 MAK Center for Art and Architecture at the Schindler House, West Hollywood
 Sam and Alfreda Maloof Foundation for Arts and Crafts, Rancho Cucamungo
 Mingei International Museum, San Diego
 Museum of Contemporary Art (MOCA), Los Angeles 
 Museum of Contemporary Art San Diego
 Museum of Latin American Art (MOLAA), Long Beach
 Natural History Museum, Los Angeles
 Norton Simon Museum, Pasadena
 ONE National Gay & Lesbian Archives, Los Angeles & West Hollywood 
 Orange County Museum of Art, Newport Beach
 Otis College of Art and Design Ben Maltz Gallery, Los Angeles
 Pacific Asia Museum, Pasadena
 Palm Springs Art Museum
 Pasadena Museum of California Art
 Pomona College Museum of Art, Claremont
 Santa Barbara Museum of Art
 Santa Monica Museum of Art
 Scripps College, Ruth Chandler Williamson Gallery, Claremont
 University Art Gallery, University of California, Irvine
 University Art Museum, California State University, Long Beach
 Vincent Price Art Museum, East Los Angeles College
 Watts Towers Arts Center, Los Angeles
 Frederick R. Weisman Museum of Art, Pepperdine University, Malibu

See also 

 Pacific Standard Time: LA/LA

References

Further reading

Art exhibitions in the United States
Art in Greater Los Angeles
1940s in Los Angeles
1950s in Los Angeles
1960s in Los Angeles
1970s in Los Angeles
2011 in Los Angeles
2012 in Los Angeles